Lindy Rodwell (born 13 February 1962, in Johannesburg) is a South African zoologist and conservationist. She works on preserving viable wetland habitat and population sizes for the cranes of Africa south of the Sahara, the endangered blue crane and grey-crowned crane and the critically endangered wattled crane.

Career 
Lindy Rodwell was awarded a BSc(Zoology) and a Higher Diploma in Education from the University of Cape Town. Later she became Africa programme coordinator for the South African Crane Working Group of the Endangered Wildlife Trust.

Rodwell is currently a Trustee of both the Endangered Wildlife Trust and the World Wildlife Fund. She co-founded the Nature's Valley Trust (NVT), a non-governmental organization, with her husband, James van Hasselt. The NVT focusses on conservation-related issues along the Garden Route.

Awards
 1999 Whitley Gold Award Winner
 2002 Whitley Continuation Award Winner
 2002 Environment Award in Rolex Awards for Enterprise

References

External links
 
 https://web.archive.org/web/20070930202447/http://www.mg.co.za/articledirect.aspx?area=mg_flat&articleid=20992

1962 births
Living people
South African conservationists
University of Cape Town alumni